The Alfa Romeo G1 (1921–23) was an Italian automobile.

It was the first all-new design from Alfa Romeo after the end of the A.L.F.A. brand. The car was designed by A.L.F.A. pioneer Giuseppe Merosi as the factory's new luxury vehicle while he simultaneously revised the prewar 24HP racing car into the 20/30ES model. At this time, he was engaged in a legal dispute with Nicola Romeo regarding the brand takeover conditions.

The chassis was lengthened and stiffened from the 1914 A.L.F.A. 40-60 HP model, entering into market territory competition with Rolls-Royce.

Total production was 52 cars. It found no customers in Italy, and all 50 production model (excepting two prototypes) found their way to Australia. Chassis numbers 6001 and 6002 were built in 1920 as prototypes, whereas 6003 to 6052 were built mostly in 1921. Only one known survivor exists as of 2019, chassis number 6018. It was in 2007 owned by New Zealand's Alfa importer and is also the oldest surviving Alfa Romeo-branded car.

References

External links 
club-alfa-romeo-passion.com:G1 advertisement

G1
Limousines
Cars introduced in 1921